Bordentown is a station on NJ Transit's River Line light rail system, located on West Park Street in Bordentown, in Burlington County, New Jersey, United States.

The station opened on March 15, 2004. Southbound service from the station is available to Camden, New Jersey. Northbound service is available to the Trenton Transit Center with connections to NJ Transit trains to New York City, SEPTA trains to Philadelphia, Pennsylvania, and Amtrak trains. Transfer to the PATCO Speedline is available at the Walter Rand Transportation Center.  Transfer to the Atlantic City Line is available at the Pennsauken Transit Center. The station is located on the edge of the Bordentown City Beach and Public Boat Ramp and the Yapewi Aquatic Club.

Transfers
NJ Transit buses: 409 on Route 130

References

External links

Bordentown, New Jersey
River Line stations
Railway stations in the United States opened in 2004
2004 establishments in New Jersey
Railway stations in Burlington County, New Jersey